Anastas Byku was a 19th-century Albanian publisher and journalist. His publication of the Pelasgos newspaper in 1861 in both Albanian and Greek languages is considered to be one of the first publications of a periodical in Albanian. His endeavor was short-lived but he tried again in 1878 with another newspaper, Promytheus o Pelasgos, this time exclusively in the Greek language. Byku held that the Greeks and the Albanians were descendants of the Pelasgians and the Illyrians, and were one single people, although they were of different religious faiths; still according to him the Albanians should be inseparable from the Greek nation: this idea would eventually estrange him from the activists of the Albanian National Awakening.

Life

Byku, signing his publications as Anastasios Pykaios, was born in Lekël, an Albanian village in the district of Tepelenë, then part of the Ottoman Empire but now in modern Albania. After finishing the Zosimea Greek language school in Ioannina, he started to work as a teacher in various Greek schools and as a journalist. In 1860–1861 in Lamia, Greece, where he was living at that time, he started to publish one of the first Albanian newspapers Πελασγος: the newspaper lasted only one year. The periodical was written in Albanian with an adapted Greek alphabet and in Greek. At the same time he published a primer textbook in Albanian called Gramë për shqipëtarët. In 1878, his last year of life, he tried to publish another newspaper, this time only in Greek, the Promytheus o Pelasgos, but without much success.

Byku deemed that it was important that the Albanians closely lived in peace with the Greek nation and both nations should be inseparable. Moreover, he noted that the Albanians and the Greeks share the same ancient origins and have to deal with common enemies. Byku also asserted that the Albanian language is a dialect of the Greek language. For this his ideas were strongly rejected by a number of Albanian nationalists, such as Thimi Mitko, who saw the Albanian nation as completely separate from the Greek one. Byku in his work Ελληνισμός και Χριστιανισμός (Hellenism and Christianity) claimed that the three enemies of the Greek nation are: Western Europeans, Bulgarians and Muslims.

References

Further reading
Αναστασίου Ι. (Μ)πυκαίου. Ελληνισμός και Χριστιανισμός, [Hellenism and Christianity] 1874. (in Greek)

1830 births
1878 deaths
Year of birth unknown
People from Tepelenë
Albanian journalists
19th-century journalists from the Ottoman Empire
Zosimaia School alumni
19th-century Albanian people
Eastern Orthodox Christians from Albania
Albanian emigrants to Greece
Albanian publishers (people)